In a general sense, the design load is the maximum amount of something a system is designed to handle or the maximum amount of something that the system can produce, which are very different meanings. For example, a crane with a design load of 20 tons is designed to be able to lift loads that weigh 20 tons or less. However, when a failure could be catastrophic, such as a crane dropping its load or collapsing entirely, a factor of safety is necessary. As a result, the crane should lift about 2 to 5 tons at the most. 

In structural design, a design load is greater than the load which the system is expected to support. This is because engineers incorporate a safety factor in their design, in order to ensure that the system will be able to support at least the expected loads (called specified loads, despite any problems with construction, materials, etc. that go unnoticed during construction.

A heater would have a general design load, meaning the maximum amount of heat it can produce. A bridge would have a specified load, with the design load being determined by engineers and applied as a theoretical load intended to ensure the actual real-world capacity of the specified load.

See also
Limit states design
Factor of safety
Specified load

Engineering concepts